The 2017–18 Northern Colorado Bears women's basketball team represented the University of Northern Colorado during the 2017–18 NCAA Division I women's basketball season. The Bears were led by fourth year head coach Kamie Ethridge, played their home games at the Bank of Colorado Arena as members of the Big Sky Conference. They finished the season 26–7, 15–3 in Big Sky play to win the Big Sky regular season championship. They defeated Montana, Idaho State, and Idaho to win the Big Sky women's tournament for the first time in program history. As a result, they received the conference's automatic bid to the NCAA women's tournament, the school's first. As the No. 10 seed in the Lexington region, they lost to Michigan in the first round.

Ethridge left Northern Colorado on April 16 after four seasons for Washington State. On April 30, former UCLA assistant head coach Jennifer Roulier-Huth was named the new head coach for the Bears.

Roster

Schedule and results

|-
!colspan=9 style=| Exhibition

|-
!colspan=9 style=| Non-conference regular season

|-
!colspan=9 style=| Big Sky regular season

|-
!colspan=9 style=| Big Sky Women's Tournament

|-
!colspan=9 style=| NCAA Women's Tournament

Rankings
2017–18 NCAA Division I women's basketball rankings

See also
 2017–18 Northern Colorado Bears men's basketball team

References

Northern Colorado
Northern Colorado Bears women's basketball seasons
Northern Colorado Bears women's basketball
Northern Colorado Bears women's basketball
Northern Colorado